The Nihilist is a 1905 American short silent film directed by Wallace McCutcheon, Sr. It takes place in the Russian Empire and relates the story of a woman who joins the Nihilist movement and commits a suicide attack against the Governor's palace to avenge her husband who died because of police repression.

Plot
After her husband has been arrested by the Tsarist police, a woman begs the governor for mercy, without success. He is condemned to be deported to Siberia and dies on the way. She decides to join a nihilist group and is ordered to bomb the governor's palace. She dies while completing her mission.

References

External links

1905 films
American silent short films
American black-and-white films
Silent American drama films
1905 drama films
Films directed by Wallace McCutcheon Sr.
1900s American films